Goodenia iyouta is a species of flowering plant in the family Goodeniaceae and is endemic to Western Australia. It is a prostrate herb with toothed, egg-shaped to elliptic stem-leaves, and racemes of dark yellow or cream-coloured flowers with a distinct pouch.

Description

Taxonomy and naming
Goodenia iyouta was first formally described in 1980 by Roger Charles Carolin in the journal Telopea from material collected in 1965. The specific epithet (iyouta) is an Aboriginal word for Triodia species, with which G. iyouta often grows.

Distribution and habitat
This goodenia grows in red, sandy soil in the northern Gibson Desert and near Roebourne in Western Australia.

Conservation status
Goodenia iyouta is classified as "not threatened" by the Department of Environment and Conservation (Western Australia).

References

iyouta
Eudicots of Western Australia
Plants described in 1980
Taxa named by Roger Charles Carolin
Endemic flora of Western Australia